A saponifiable lipid is part of the ester functional group.  They are made up of long chain carboxylic (of fatty) acids connected to an alcoholic functional group through the ester linkage which can undergo saponification, hence the name. The fatty acids are released on based catalyzed ester hydrolysis. The primary saponifiable lipids are triacylglycerides, glycerophospholipids, and the sphingolipids.

contain esters, which can undergo saponification(hydrolysis under basic conditions) (waxes, triglycerides, phospho-glycerides, sphingolipids)

A non-saponifiable class is made up of "fat-soluble" A and E vitamins  and cholesterol. Under basic conditions -- like phospholipids, glycolipids, sphingolipids, and the waxes-- it can be hydrolyzed.  These lipids are known as complex lipids.

See also
 Lipids
 Simple lipid

References

H. Stephen Stoker. General, Organic, and Biological Chemistry, 6th ed. Cengage Learning, Nov 15, 2011 pg. 697

Lipids